Phaegoptera chorima is a moth of the family Erebidae. It was described by William Schaus in 1896. It is found in southern Brazil.

References

Phaegoptera
Moths described in 1896